This article lists the results for the Northern Ireland national football team between 2000 and 2019.

2000s

2000

2001

2002

2003

2004

2005

2006

2007

2008

2009

2010s

2010

2011

2012

2013

2014

2015

2016

2017

2018

2019

Notes

References

External links
RSSSF: (Northern) Ireland - International Results
Northern Ireland Football Greats Archive
Northern Ireland Statistics and Records

2000-19
results
results
results
results
results
results
results
results
results
results
results
results
results
results
results
results
results
results
results
results
results